Queen Uijeong of the Gim clan (Hangul: 의정왕후 김씨, Hanja: 義靜王后 金氏; d. 1170) or known as Queen Mother Gwangjeong was a Goryeo royal family member as the third daughter Duke Gangneung who married her half second cousin once removed, King Myeongjong as his first and primary wife. She was also the mother of his only successor and two daughters.

From all of her families' records, just she who didn't appear clearly about her life. It was believed that she married Myeongjong when he was still "Marquess Ikyang" (익양후) and "Duke Ikyang" (익양공), but eventually died after his ascension to the throne succeeded his brother, King Uijong. Seeing that their eldest son was born in 1152, so the couple was presumed to marry before it and after this son ascended the throne in 1211, he honoured his late mother as a "Queen Mother" (태후, 太后) and gave her Posthumous name. Although she never became Queen consort, but as an example of a queen, it seems that her ritual was again performed and after her husband death, Choe Chung-heon performed it.

Posthumous name
In October 1253 (40th year reign of King Gojong), name Gong-pyeong (공평, 恭平) was added to her Posthumous name.

References

External links
Queen Uijeong on Encykorea .
광정태후 on Doosan Encyclopedia .

Royal consorts of the Goryeo Dynasty
Year of birth unknown
Date of birth unknown
Year of death unknown
Date of death unknown